Nabokovia is a Neotropical genus of butterflies, named by Arthur Francis Hemming in honour of Vladimir Nabokov, who extensively studied the Polyommatinae subfamily.

Three species are recognized:
Nabokovia ada Bálint & Johnson, 1994
Nabokovia cuzquenha Bálint & Lamas, [1997]
Nabokovia faga (Dognin 1895)

Notes

External links

Images representing Nabokovia at Butterflies of America

Polyommatini
Vladimir Nabokov
Lycaenidae of South America
Lycaenidae genera